Puncheon Run is a  long 2nd order tributary to the St. Jones River in Kent County, Delaware.

Variant names
According to the Geographic Names Information System, it has also been known historically as:  
Puncheon Branch
Walkers Branch

Course
Puncheon Run rises on the Cahoon Branch divide about 1 mile southwest of Dover, Delaware.

Watershed
Puncheon Run drains  of area, receives about 44.8 in/year of precipitation, has a topographic wetness index of 627.80 and is about 4.3% forested.

See also
List of rivers of Delaware

Maps

References 

Rivers of Delaware
Rivers of Kent County, Delaware
Tributaries of Delaware Bay